Stefan Vasilev (born 5 November 1948) is a Bulgarian former sports shooter. He competed in two events at the 1972 Summer Olympics.

References

External links
 

1948 births
Living people
Bulgarian male sport shooters
Olympic shooters of Bulgaria
Shooters at the 1972 Summer Olympics
Sportspeople from Sofia
20th-century Bulgarian people